The 1996–97 English Hockey League season took place from October 1996 until April 1997.

The Men's National League was won by Reading with the Women's National League going to Slough.

The Men's Hockey Association Cup was won by Teddington and the AEWHA Cup was won by Ipswich.

Men's National League Premier Division League Standings

Women's National League Premier Division League Standings

Men's Cup (Hockey Association Cup)

Quarter-finals

Semi-finals

Final 
(Held at the Stadium, Milton Keynes on 11 May)

Teddington
Jon Ebsworth, Tyrone Moore, Phil McGuire, S Dawkins, Tony Colclough, Jason Laslett, Jimmy Wallis, Simon Nicklin, Jon Hauck, Nick Conway, Andy Billson subs D Haydon, Paul Way, G Read
Reading
Wayne Box GK, John Slay, Jon Wyatt, Charlie Oscroft, Andy Holden, Mark Hoskin, G Edwards, K Sanders, Robert Todd, Mark Pearn, Scott Ashdown subs A Jones, Simon Briscoe, Jonathan Loose

Women's Cup (AEWHA Cup)

Quarter-finals

Semi-finals

Final 
(Held at Milton Keynes on 25 May)

Hightown
Carolyn Reid; Linda Carr (capt), Michaela Morton, Caroline Gilbert, K Walsh; Julie Aspin, Fiona Lee, Michelle Liptrot, Lucy Newcombe, Tina Cullen, Yana Williams Sub Maggie Souyave
Clifton
Claire Burr; Sue Brimble, Rachel O'Bryan, Michelle Robertson, Louise Hipkins, Lorraine Marsden, Tammy Miller (capt), Elaine Basterfield, Lucy Culliford, Denise Marston-Smith, Juliet Rayden Subs J Martin, J Scullion

References 

1996
field hockey
field hockey
1996 in field hockey
1997 in field hockey